Gerhard "Gerd" Wiltfang (27 April 1946 in Stuhr, Lower Saxony – 1 July 1997 in Thedinghausen) was a German equestrian and Olympic champion. He won a gold medal in show jumping with the West German team at the 1972 Summer Olympics in Munich. In 1978, he won the World Championship in show jumping, and in 1982 the silver medal.

Witfang was married to Rita, with whom he had three children.  They divorced and she later married Alwin Schockemöhle.

Wiltfang died in 1997 of heart failure.

References

External links

1946 births
1997 deaths
People from Diepholz (district)
German male equestrians
Olympic equestrians of West Germany
Olympic gold medalists for West Germany
Equestrians at the 1972 Summer Olympics
Olympic medalists in equestrian
Medalists at the 1972 Summer Olympics
Sportspeople from Lower Saxony